Down Home New York is an album by the American jazz saxophonist Archie Shepp recorded in 1984 and released on the Italian Soul Note label.

Reception
The Allmusic review by Ron Wynn awarded the album 3 stars stating "Archie Shepp was the picture of rebellion and anger in the 1960s, but he became the voice of swing, blues and classicism in the 1980s. Shepp displayed his penchant for honking R&B and soulful blues on this 1984 date".

Track listing
All compositions by Archie Shepp except as indicated
 "Down Home New York" - 10:50 
 "'Round About Midnight" (Thelonious Monk, Cootie Williams) - 9:13 
 "May 16th" (Saheb Sarbib) - 9:06 
 "The 4th World" - 6:02 
 "Straight Street" (John Coltrane) - 6:36
Recorded at Classic Sound Studio in New York City on February 5, 6, 7 & 8, 1984

Personnel
Archie Shepp – tenor saxophone, soprano saxophone, voice
Charles E. McGhee - trumpet, voice 
Ken Werner – piano, voice
Saheb Sarbib – bass, electric bass, voice
Marvin "Bugalu" Smith – drums, voice
Bazzi Bartholomew Gray - voice

References

Black Saint/Soul Note albums
Archie Shepp albums
1984 albums